Green Gables, also known as the Wells House, is a historic home at 1501 South Harbor City Boulevard in Melbourne, Florida, United States. The house fronts the Indian River. Local business man William T. Wells purchased the Strobah property and built the Green Gables in 1886 with his wife Nora Stanford Wells as a winter home. Green Gables is an example of Queen Anne style architecture, and it is believed to be the first home in the area with indoor plumbing and an indoor bathroom. On May 18, 2016, it was added to the U.S. National Register of Historic Places. Green Gables was scheduled for demolition in 2015, but a group of local historians and community volunteers are working with the owners, fourth generation family members, to save the house due to its historical significance to the area. The community needed $500,000 to salvage the house as of April 2020.

William Twining Wells
Wells was from New Jersey and New York, and owned the Wells Rustless Iron Company. Wells managed a pineapple plantation on the beach. He also donated the land for a local park named Wells Park.

References and external links
 

Brevard County listings at National Register of Historic Places

Buildings and structures in Melbourne, Florida
Houses completed in 1896
Houses in Brevard County, Florida
National Register of Historic Places in Brevard County, Florida
Queen Anne architecture in Florida
U.S. Route 1